Giuseppe Piromalli may refer to:
Giuseppe Piromalli (born 1921) (1921–2005), Calabrian 'Ndrangheta crime boss
Giuseppe Piromalli (born 1945), Calabrian 'Ndrangheta crime boss, nephew and successor of the above